Isser Yehuda Unterman (
19 April 1886 – 26 January 1976) was the Ashkenazi Chief Rabbi of Israel from 1964 until 1972.

Biography
Isser Yehuda Unterman was born in Brest-Litovsk, now Belarus. He studied  at the Etz Chaim Yeshiva in Maltsch under Rabbi Shimon Shkop.

Rabbinic career
Returning to Lithuania to complete his studies, Unterman was ordained as a rabbi by Rabbi Refael Shapiro, and by Rabbi Simcha Zelig Reguer, the Dayan of Brisk. He founded  his own yeshiva in the town of Vishnyeva around 1910. Unterman served a variety of roles in the Lithuanian Jewish community until 1924, when he was selected to become the head rabbi of Liverpool. Unterman served in Liverpool for 22 years, becoming an important figure in the English Zionist movement and working to relieve the suffering of refugees in England during the Second World War.

In 1946, Unterman became the Chief Rabbi of Tel Aviv, a position he held for twenty years before being appointed Chief Rabbi of Israel. As Chief Rabbi, Unterman worked to reform the rabbinic court system and reach out to secular Israelis. He also wrote opinions on a variety of religious issues relevant to the young Jewish state, such as religious conversion and marriage law.

He founded two advanced Talmudical academies (kollels), one in Tel Aviv and one in Jerusalem, designed to prepare select students for the rabbinate and educational positions, with an emphasis on systematic study of Talmud and practical halakhah.

Rabbi Unterman died on January 26, 1976, in Jerusalem.

Halachic decisions
A woman once extended her hand to Rabbi Unterman and he immediately shook it. He later explained, “Don’t think that I am lax on not touching women. I am stringent on respect for all humanity.”

As rabbi of Liverpool, Rabbi Unterman had required converts to Judaism to fully accept Torah observance. But in 1972, he wrote that the rabbinic establishment needed to be more lenient with the anticipated Russian Aliyah, given the circumstances of their lives in the Soviet Union. While a convert's sincere intention to accept mitzvot is a necessary condition for conversion, the rabbi advocated a lenient approach when dealing with the conversion of non-Jewish spouses.

Writings
 Shevet mi-Yehudah (1952) - on issues in halakhah

See also
Reva Unterman

References

External links
)

1886 births
1976 deaths
Ashkenazi Jews in Mandatory Palestine
Ashkenazi rabbis in Ottoman Palestine
Israeli Ashkenazi Jews
20th-century Lithuanian rabbis
Chief rabbis of Israel
Chief rabbis of Tel Aviv
Burials at the Jewish cemetery on the Mount of Olives
Rabbis from Brest, Belarus
Belarusian Orthodox Jews
Israeli people of Belarusian-Jewish descent
20th-century English rabbis
Clergy from Liverpool
20th-century Israeli rabbis